The 2009 NCAA Division I FBS football season was the highest level of college football competition in the United States organized by the National Collegiate Athletic Association (NCAA).

The regular season began on September 3, 2009 and ended on December 12, 2009. The postseason concluded on January 7, 2010 with the BCS National Championship Game in Pasadena, California, where the Alabama Crimson Tide defeated the Texas Longhorns by the score of 37–21.

For the first time in the history of the Heisman Trophy, the annual award for the most outstanding player in college football, two previous Heisman winners played in the same season—2008 winner Sam Bradford of Oklahoma and 2007 winner Tim Tebow of Florida. For the first time since 1946, the top three vote-getters from the previous season all returned: Bradford, Colt McCoy of Texas, and Tebow, in that order.  Six teams finished the regular season undefeated; a record for the BCS era.

Rule changes
The NCAA football rules committee proposed several rule changes for 2009. The rule changes include the following:

If the home team wears colored jerseys, the visiting team may also wear colored jerseys so long as the two teams have agreed to do so. This rule comes as a result of the traditional USC-UCLA game where both teams wore their home uniforms. Previously, the visiting team would be charged a first-half timeout for illegal equipment.
If the punter carries the ball outside of the tackle box, he is no longer protected under the roughing the kicker penalty.
Deliberately grabbing the chin strap is now included as part of the face mask penalty.
The edge of the tackle box is defined as being five yards to the left and right of the snapper, rather than two parallel lines from the position of the offensive tackles.
Periods will not be extended for plays that result in loss of down (i.e. illegal forward pass).
If a defensive player is injured, the play clock will be reset to 40 seconds.  The play clock will be reset to 25 seconds for an injury to an offensive player.

Conference changes
Western Kentucky joined the Sun Belt Conference after playing the 2008 as an FBS independent, completing their two-year transition from the Football Championship Subdivision (FCS). The number of full FBS members increased to 120.

New and updated stadiums
 Akron opened InfoCision Stadium – Summa Field against  on September 12, winning 41–0.
 Minnesota christened their new TCF Bank Stadium with a win, defeating Air Force 20–13 on September 12.
 Missouri expanded the capacity of Faurot Field from 68,349 to 71,004.
 Indiana expanded the capacity of Memorial Stadium from 49,225 to 52,929 with the horseshoeing of the North End Zone.

Regular season top 10 matchups
Rankings reflect the AP Poll. Rankings for Week 8 and beyond will list BCS Rankings first and AP Poll second. Teams that failed to be a top 10 team for one poll or the other will be noted.
Week 1
No. 5 Alabama defeated No. 7 Virginia Tech, 34–24 (Georgia Dome, Atlanta, Georgia)
Week 2
No. 3 USC defeated No. 8 Ohio State, 18–15 (Ohio Stadium, Columbus, Ohio)
Week 6
No. 1 Florida defeated No. 4 LSU, 13–3 (Tiger Stadium, Baton Rouge, Louisiana)
Week 9
No. 10/10 Oregon defeated No. 5/4 USC, 47–20 (Autzen Stadium, Eugene, Oregon)
Week 10
No. 3/3 Alabama defeated No. 9/9 LSU, 24–15 (Bryant-Denny Stadium, Tuscaloosa, Alabama)
Week 14
No. 2/2 Alabama defeated No. 1/1 Florida, 32–13 (2009 SEC Championship Game, Georgia Dome, Atlanta, Georgia)

Conference standings

Conference summaries
Rankings reflect the Week 14 AP Poll before the conference championship games were played.

For the first time since 1983, every conference in Division I FBS, even those that did not contest a championship game, had an undisputed champion.

* In July 2011, the NCAA released its findings from a two-year investigation into allegations that a Georgia Tech player received $321 in clothing from a runner for an agent. While no conclusive evidence was brought against the player, actions taken by the Georgia Tech athletic department were perceived as an attempt to hinder the NCAA investigation into this offense. The NCAA determined that the player should have been declared ineligible for the final three games of the 2009 season. As punishment for an accused "lack of cooperation" and hindering the investigation, Georgia Tech was required to vacate the ACC Championship Game win, along with other penalties. Consequently, there is currently no official 2009 ACC football champion.

Bowl games

Bowl Challenge Cup standings

* Does not meet minimum game requirement of three teams needed for a conference to be eligible. (In any case, "Independent" is not a conference, rather, it is the lack of one.)

Awards and honors

Heisman Trophy voting

The Heisman Trophy is given to the year's most outstanding player

Other award winners
Walter Camp Award (top player): Colt McCoy, QB, Texas
Maxwell Award (top player): Colt McCoy, QB, Texas
AP Player of the Year: Ndamukong Suh, DT, Nebraska
Bronko Nagurski Trophy (defensive player): Ndamukong Suh, DT, Nebraska
Campbell Trophy (academic award, formerly the Draddy Trophy): Tim Tebow, QB, Florida
Chuck Bednarik Award (defensive player): Ndamukong Suh, DT, Nebraska
Dave Rimington Trophy (center): Maurkice Pouncey, C, Florida
Davey O'Brien Award (quarterback): Colt McCoy, QB, Texas
Dick Butkus Award (linebacker): Rolando McClain, LB, Alabama
Doak Walker Award (running back): Toby Gerhart, RB, Stanford
Fred Biletnikoff Award (wide receiver): Golden Tate, WR, Notre Dame
Jim Thorpe Award (defensive back): Eric Berry, CB, Tennessee
John Mackey Award (tight end): Aaron Hernandez, TE, Florida
Johnny Unitas Award (Sr. quarterback): Colt McCoy, QB, Texas
Lombardi Award (top lineman): Ndamukong Suh, DT, Nebraska
Lott Trophy (defensive impact): Jerry Hughes, DE, TCU
Lou Groza Award (placekicker): Kai Forbath, K, UCLA
Manning Award (quarterback): Colt McCoy, QB, Texas
Outland Trophy (interior lineman): Ndamukong Suh, DT, Nebraska
Ray Guy Award (punter): Drew Butler, P, Georgia
Sammy Baugh Trophy (quarterback, specifically passer): Case Keenum, QB, Houston
Ted Hendricks Award (defensive end): Jerry Hughes, DE, TCU
Wuerffel Trophy (humanitarian-athlete): Tim Hiller, QB, Western Michigan
The Home Depot Coach of the Year Award: Brian Kelly, Cincinnati
AP Coach of the Year: Gary Patterson, TCU
Paul "Bear" Bryant Award (head coach): Chris Petersen, Boise State
Walter Camp Coach of the Year (head coach): Gary Patterson, TCU
Bobby Bowden National Collegiate Coach of the Year Award: Nick Saban, Alabama
Broyles Award (assistant coach): Kirby Smart, Alabama

All-Americans

Records
The Iowa Hawkeyes became the first NCAA Division I FBS team to block two field goals on consecutive plays in their season-opening win over Northern Iowa.
Brandon West of Western Michigan set the NCAA Division I FBS records for career all-purpose yards and career kick return yards.  On November 14, West broke the record of 7,573 all-purpose yards set by DeAngelo Williams of Memphis.  Against Michigan State on November 7, West broke the record of 2,945 return yards set by Jessie Henderson of SMU.  West finished the season setting the records at 3,118 kick return yards and 7,764 total yards.
Russell Wilson of North Carolina State set a new Division I record for most passes attempted without an interception, breaking the previous record of 325 set by André Woodson of Kentucky from 2006–07. Wilson broke the record in the third quarter of the Pack's 45–14 win over Gardner–Webb on September 19. The streak ended at 379 on October 3 against Wake Forest. Wilson's last interception had been in the third quarter of the Wolfpack's game against Clemson on September 13, 2008.
Texas' Colt McCoy picked up his 43rd career win as a starting quarterback, breaking the previous FBS record of 42 by Georgia's David Greene, with a 51–20 win over Kansas on November 21. The record was extended to 45 with wins over Texas A&M in the regular-season finale and Nebraska in the Big 12 Championship Game. However, his streak ended at the BCS Championship when he was injured early in the first quarter, and the Longhorns lost 37-21.
 C. J. Spiller of Clemson set a new record for career kickoff return touchdowns on the opening kickoff of the Tigers' game against archrival South Carolina on November 28. His seventh career TD return broke the previous record held by Anthony Davis of USC and Ashlan Davis of Tulsa.
 Central Michigan quarterback Dan LeFevour set a new FBS record for most combined career touchdowns passing, rushing, and receiving in the MAC Championship Game against Ohio. His two TD passes in the game gave him a career total of 148, surpassing the previous record of 147 held by Colt Brennan of Hawaii and Graham Harrell of Texas Tech. In the GMAC Bowl, he passed for a TD and ran for another, ending his career with a total of 150 TDs.
 On December 12, 2009 against rival Army, Navy quarterback Ricky Dobbs ran for his 24th rushing touchdown on the season, giving him the single-season record for most rushing touchdowns by a quarterback.
On December 30, 2009 in the Humanitarian Bowl against Idaho, Bowling Green wide receiver Freddie Barnes broke the single-season record for receptions, accumulating 155 total receptions on the year.

Coaching changes

Preseason

Postseason
Note:
 All November and December dates are in 2009; all January dates are in 2010.
 Incoming coaches who were the designated replacement for their predecessors are in bold italics.

On December 26, Florida head coach Urban Meyer announced his resignation due to health concerns, effective after the Gators' Sugar Bowl appearance. However, Meyer had a change of heart and announced the following day  that he would instead take an indefinite leave of absence, and expected to be back coaching by the start of the 2010 season. Offensive coordinator Steve Addazio took over Meyer's duties in his absence. Meyer returned from his self-imposed leave in time for Florida's 2010 spring practice.

TV ratings

Ten most watched regular season games in 2009
1. December 5 – 2009 SEC Championship – CBS – 1 Florida vs 2 Alabama – 17.969 million viewers
2. December 5 – 2009 Big 12 Championship – ESPN on ABC – 3 Texas vs 22 Nebraska – 12.693 million viewers
3. September 12 – ESPN – 3 USC vs 8 Ohio State – 10.586 million viewers
4. October 10 – CBS – 4 LSU vs 1 Florida – 10.496 million viewers
5. October 17 – Red River Rivalry – ESPN on ABC – 20 Oklahoma vs 3 Texas – 8.713 million Viewers
6. September 7 – ESPN – Miami vs 18 Florida State – 8.406 million viewers
7. September 12 – ESPN on ABC – 18 Notre Dame vs Michigan – 8.391 million viewers
8. November 27 – Iron Bowl – CBS – 2 Alabama vs Auburn – 8.124 million viewers
9. October 3 – ESPN on ABC Regional – 8 Oklahoma vs 17 Miami & California vs 7 USC – 7.834 million viewers
10. November 28 – CBS – Florida State vs 1 Florida – 7.491 million viewers

Notes

References

External links